The Turkish State Railways operate freight trains on all of their lines. TCDD has a big fleet of covered goods wagons, flat wagons, tank wagons, open wagons and hoppers. TCDD also has a few schnabel cars and crane cars. TCDD carries freight such as bulk, shipping containers, liquids and goods.

As of 2012, 25.7 million ton is transported by rail in Turkey. Two steel companies, Erdemir and Kardemir, top 2 customers of TCDD, had transported 4.5 million ton in 2012, mainly iron ore and coal.

2.1 million tons of rail freight belong to international traffic. Most of international traffic is between Turkey and Europe, done via Kapikule. Several container trains are running in this route as well as conventional wagons.

Containers are widely used both in international and domestic transportation. 7.6 million ton is carried in containers. TCDD is supporting transportation by containers. Thus almost all of the private railway companies invested in container wagons, and carrying 20% of all rail freight by their own wagons.

TCDD has plans to strengthen freight traffic by adding 4000 km conventional lines until 2023. That includes new international rail connections to Georgia, Iraq and Iran. TCDD is also constructing 18 logistic centers to enable transportation of more loads by rail.

TCDD is planning to increase its transit traffic (11000 to in 2011) by constructing "iron silk road" to connect Europe to Asia. Marmaray is the most important part of this project which is supposed to complete in 2015. Another project is Kars–Tbilisi–Baku railway which will be completed in 2014. TCDD wants to have share from the freight traffic between Europe and China.

Container Lines to Europe
As of May 2014, there are 3 companies organizing regular container trains between Turkey and Europe: IFB, Balo and Metrans. The weekly departures by these 3 companies is about 10 in each direction in total. By 16 June 2014 IFB ended direct container service to Turkey and started using vessel connection via Constanta powered by Global Multimodal.

There are also other services started in 2014 such as intermodal trailer service by Ulusoy Logistics and swapbody train by Transfesa.

Consists
TCDD usually uses the 22000 series, 33000 series or the 24000 series to pull the trains on long-distance routes. The DE11000 series and the DH9500 series usually does the shutting in yards or pulls the freight trains short distances. Train consists are usually 15-30 cars long.

Busiest Lines
The rail lines to cities such as İstanbul, Ankara, Zonguldak, Samsun, Adana, Mersin and İskendurun see heavy freight traffic. The Karabük-Zonguldak section of the Irmak-Zonguldak Rail Line is the 3rd busiest line in freight traffic, after the Istanbul–Ankara Main Line and the Adana–Mersin Railway Line.

References

Rail freight transport in Turkey